7B or VII-B may refer to :
 7B (band), a Russian band
 7B (Long Island bus)
 SR-7B, a part of the Southern Region for the Order of the Arrow in the Boy Scouts of America
 Sudan Red 7B, a red diazo dye
 Suiche 7B, an Interbank network
 WASP-7b, an extrasolar planet discovered in 2008
 IATA airline designator of Moscow Airlines (formerly Atlant-Soyuz Airlines)
7B, the production code for the 1986 Doctor Who serial Mindwarp
 Boron-7 (7B), an isotope of boron

See also
 List of highways numbered 7B
B7 (disambiguation)